Greg Knox (born September 10, 1963) is an American college football coach. He is a senior offensive analyst at Mississippi State University. Knox served as interim head football coach at Mississippi State for the final game of the 2017 and at the University of Florida for the final two games in 2021. From 2009 to 2021, he was Dan Mullen's running backs, first at Missisppii State and then at Florida.

Although Knox was due to follow Mullen to Florida, he served as interim coach of the Mississippi State Bulldogs in their victory at the 2017 TaxSlayer Bowl. He served as the interim head coach for the Florida Gators after Mullen was dismissed in the 2021 season, Knox led the Gators to a win over the Florida State in the regular season finale  and a loss against UCF in the 2021 Gasparilla Bowl.

Head coaching record

References

External links
 Mississippi State profile

1963 births
Living people
American football quarterbacks
Auburn Tigers football coaches
Buffalo Bulls football coaches
Florida Gators football coaches
Mississippi State Bulldogs football coaches
Northeastern State RiverHawks football coaches
Northeastern State RiverHawks football players
Ole Miss Rebels football coaches
Stephen F. Austin Lumberjacks football coaches
TCU Horned Frogs football coaches
People from Rosebud, Texas
Coaches of American football from Texas
Players of American football from Texas
African-American coaches of American football
African-American players of American football
20th-century African-American sportspeople
21st-century African-American sportspeople